Le Le Le may refer to:

Lê Lê Lê, a song by Brazilian duo João Neto & Frederico
"Le Le Le", B-side of the single release "Boom Bip", by Zion I